Kosmos 931 ( meaning Cosmos 931) was a Soviet US-K missile early warning satellite which was launched in 1977 as part of the Soviet military's Oko programme. The satellite was designed to identify missile launches using optical telescopes and infrared sensors.

Kosmos 931 was launched from Site 43/3 at Plesetsk Cosmodrome in the Russian SSR. A Molniya-M carrier rocket with a 2BL upper stage was used to perform the launch, which took place at 04:44 UTC on 20 July 1977. The launch successfully placed the satellite into a molniya orbit. It subsequently received its Kosmos designation, and the international designator 1977-068A. The United States Space Command assigned it the Satellite Catalog Number 10150.

Podvig says that it self-destructed and never reached the correct orbit.

See also

List of Kosmos satellites (751–1000)
List of R-7 launches (1975-1979)
1977 in spaceflight
List of Oko satellites

References

Kosmos satellites
1977 in spaceflight
Oko
Spacecraft launched by Molniya-M rockets
Spacecraft launched in 1977